Vegard Haukø Sklett (born 10 February 1986) is a Norwegian former ski jumper.

He made his Continental Cup debut in August 2007, his best result being the victories from Sapporo and Bischofshofen in January 2009. He made his World Cup debut in January 2009 in Sapporo, finishing 24th.

References

1986 births
Living people
Norwegian male ski jumpers
People from Nord-Trøndelag
Sportspeople from Trøndelag